Lewis County Schools is the operating school district for Lewis County, Kentucky. The district is governed by the Lewis County Board of Education, of which the current Superintendent is Jamie Weddington.

Schools

High school 

 Lewis County High School - Vanceburg, Kentucky

Middle school 

 Lewis County Middle School - Vanceburg, Kentucky

Elementary schools 

 Lewis County Central Elementary - Vanceburg, Kentucky
 Garrison Elementary School - Garrison, Kentucky
 Tollesboro Elementary School - Tollesboro, Kentucky
 Laurel Elementary School - Vanceburg, Kentucky

In addition to six traditional K-12 schools, the district operates the Foster Meade Career & Tech Center located in Vanceburg, Kentucky.

Statistics

Student demographics 
As of 2019, the student body demographics were:

 White (non-Hispanic): 96.6%
 Two or More Races: 2.6%
 Hispanic or Latino: 0.5%
 Other: 0.3%

Lewis County Board of Education 
The Lewis County Board of Education is composed of five elected board members. As of June 2020, the current board consists of:

References 

School districts in Kentucky
Education in Lewis County, Kentucky